The Guns and the Fury is a 1981 film starring Peter Graves and Cameron Mitchell.

Overview
After the turn of the century, two fortune hunters discover oil in Persia, when they try to claim it serious resistance stands in their way.

Cast
Peter Graves - Mark Janser 
Cameron Mitchell - Jack Piper 
Michael Ansara - Prince Sohrab 
Albert Salmi - Colonel Liakhov 
Barry Stokes - Paul Halders 
Shaun Curry - Major Wayne-Smith 
Derren Nesbitt - Captain Noel 
Ahmed Mazhar - Sheik Khazal Khan 
Monique Vermeer - Suzanne Fournier 
Benjamin Feitelson - Karim Kahn

References

External links
 
 

1981 films
1981 action films
American action films
Films set in the 1900s
Films set in Iran
Works about petroleum
1980s English-language films
1980s American films